Synelasma baramensis is a species of beetle in the family Cerambycidae. It was described by Heyden in 1897. It is known from Sumatra and Borneo.

References

Pteropliini
Beetles described in 1897